The Bouzanne is an  long river in the Indre département of central France, and is a tributary of the Creuse.

Communes along its course 

The following list is ordered from source to mouth : Aigurande, La Buxerette, Montchevrier, Cluis, Mouhers, Neuvy-Saint-Sépulchre, Tranzault, Lys-Saint-Georges, Buxières-d'Aillac, Jeu-les-Bois, Arthon, Velles, Tendu, Mosnay, Saint-Marcel, Chasseneuil, Le Pont-Chrétien-Chabenet

References

Rivers of France
Rivers of Centre-Val de Loire
Rivers of Indre